The Church of Saint Charles Borromeo and Our Lady of the Assumption is a Roman Catholic parish church in the neighbourhood of Prado, Montevideo, Uruguay.

The parish was established on 29 April 1934.

The temple is an interesting example of Modern Architecture using reinforced concrete with parabolic shapes; the project was designed by architect Juan Pablo Terra, the structural calculation by Eladio Dieste, the acoustics by Luis García Pardo, and the construction was performed by the company Álvaro Palenga in 1956.

References

1934 establishments in Uruguay
Roman Catholic churches completed in 1956
Roman Catholic church buildings in Montevideo
Modernist architecture in Uruguay
Prado, Montevideo
20th-century Roman Catholic church buildings in Uruguay